The Diocese of Stockton is a Latin Church ecclesiastical territory or diocese of the Catholic Church in the Central Valley and Mother Lode region of California in the United States. Its cathedral is the Cathedral of the Annunciation, a Marian church, in Stockton. It is a suffragan diocese in the ecclesiastical province of the metropolitan Archbishop of San Francisco

Extent and statistics 
, the Diocese of Stockton pastorally serves 250,692 Catholics (18.4% of 1,361,162 total) on 15,995 km² in 35 parishes with 97 priests (83 diocesan, 14 religious), 51 deacons, 66 lay religious (15 brothers, 51 sisters), 6 seminarians and 12 missions.

It covers the counties of Alpine, Calaveras, Mono, San Joaquin, Stanislaus and Tuolumne.
 
The diocese is geographically and ethnically diverse. The majority of the population lives in the San Joaquin Valley. The two major population cities are Stockton and Modesto. The diocese has shown a significant population increase in all counties except Alpine County. The majority of San Joaquin Valley is farming, and there are many migrant camps in which the Church has a presence.

Calaveras, Tuolumne and Alpine counties are located on the western side of the Sierra Nevada mountain range. Most parishes in these counties date back to the gold rush days. Mono County is on the eastern side of the Sierra Nevada Mountain range and is usually cut off from the rest of the diocese during winter. The parish church located in Mammoth Lakes provides for the spiritual care of vacationers during the winter and summer.

The largest racial/ethnic groups in the Diocese are White and Hispanic. There are  also many of Filipino and South East Asian descent. The largest Azorean Portuguese population outside the Azores is found in the Diocese of Stockton. It is estimated that 60% of the diocesan Catholic population is Hispanic. However, this does not imply that Spanish is their first language, only that their heritage is Spanish. The largest Pacific Island community is the Filipino community. Then the next largest ethnic concentration is Vietnamese. The USCCB statement Asian and Pacific Presence lists the Diocese of Stockton as among the top thirty dioceses in the United States with the highest Asian and Pacific Island population. Within the Diocese, Mass is celebrated more than 180 times each Sunday in English, Spanish, Portuguese, Latin and Laotian. Weekday masses are celebrated in these languages and Vietnamese.

Its fellow suffragans in the -mainly Californian- ecclesiastical province of the Archbishop of San Francisco include the Dioceses of Honolulu (on Hawaii), Las Vegas, Oakland, Reno, Sacramento, Salt Lake City, San Jose, and Santa Rosa.

History 
The Diocese of Stockton was formed on January 13, 1962 on Californian territories split off from the Archdiocese of San Francisco (which remains its  Metropolitan) and from the Diocese of Sacramento. In 1966 it gained more territory from the Diocese of Sacramento.

Sex abuse and bankruptcy
In 1998 a jury awarded two brothers $30 million in a judgement against the Diocese of Stockton over its handling of a priest who sexually abused the men while they were boys, starting when they were three. At the trial it was revealed that in a 1976 letter to his superiors Oliver O'Grady, the abusive priest, had admitted to sexually abusing an 11-year-old girl. In 1984 an attorney for the diocese promised to get O'Grady away from children, a promise recorded in a police report.  O'Grady abused the boys who later brought the suit from 1978-1991. In 1993 he pleaded guilty to abusing them and was sentenced to 14 years in prison. During the O'Grady trial Mahony claimed that O'Grady was the only accused priest he dealt with in Stockton.  Later in 2004 Mahony admitted under oath that parents had confronted him with accusations against another priest in the diocese, Antonio Munoz. In 2014, the Diocese filed for Chapter 11 Bankruptcy, which was later granted in 2017. As a result of the bankruptcy agreement, approximately $15 million had to be paid to various people who were sexually abused by clergy in the Diocese.

Bishops

Bishops of Stockton
 Hugh Aloysius Donohoe (1962-1969), appointed Bishop of Fresno
 Merlin Guilfoyle (1970-1979)
 Roger Mahony (1980-1985), appointed Archbishop of Los Angeles (Cardinal in 1991)
 Donald Montrose (1985-1999)
 Stephen Blaire (1999-2018)
 Myron Joseph Cotta (2018–present)

Other priest of this diocese who became bishop
Ramon Bejarano, appointed auxiliary bishop of San Diego in 2020

Parishes 

The Diocese of Stockton consists of eight deaneries. A list of the parish and mission churches in each deanery is found at List of churches in the Roman Catholic Diocese of Stockton.

Catholic education

High schools 
 St. Mary's High School, Stockton
 Central Catholic High School, Modesto

Elementary/Junior high schools 
 All Saints Academy, Stockton
 Annunciation School, Stockton
 Presentation Catholic School, Stockton
 Our Lady of Fatima School, Modesto
 Sacred Heart School, Patterson
 Sacred Heart School, Turlock
 St. Anne School, Lodi
 St. Anthony School, Manteca
 St. Bernard School, Tracy
 St. Luke School, Stockton
 St. Stanislaus School, Modesto

Active ministries, movements, and orders
 Communion and Liberation (meetings held at St. Luke's Catholic Church)
 Dominican Sisters of San Rafael, California (St. Joseph's Medical Center, Stockton)
 Legion of Mary (active at numerous parishes)
 Newman Center (University of the Pacific / San Joaquin Delta College, Stanislaus State University)
 Oblates of St. Francis de Sales (St. Mary's High School, Stockton)

See also 

 Catholic Church by country
 Catholic Church in the United States
 List of Catholic dioceses (structured view) (including archdioceses)
 Ecclesiastical Province of San Francisco
 Global organisation of the Catholic Church
 List of Roman Catholic archdioceses (by country and continent)
 List of Roman Catholic dioceses (alphabetical) (including archdioceses)
 List of the Catholic dioceses of the United States

References

Sources and External links 
 Roman Catholic Diocese of Stockton Official Site
 GCatholic, with Google map
 Roman Catholic Archdiocese of San Francisco
 Communion and Liberation, United States
 Communion and Liberation Stockton School of Community
 Dominican Sisters of San Rafael, California
 Oblates of St. Francis de Sales, Toledo-Detroit Province

 
Stockton
Catholic Church in California
Christian organizations established in 1962
Stockton
Stockton
1962 establishments in California
Companies that filed for Chapter 11 bankruptcy in 2014